Courtney Love is an American singer, songwriter, musician, and actress, whose career began in 1989 when she established the alternative rock band Hole. She would transition into acting in the mid-1990s, appearing in a lead role as Althea Leasure in The People vs. Larry Flynt (1996), which earned her numerous critical accolades, including a Golden Globe Award nomination for Best Actress. She was also named best actress by various critics associations. In 2000, Love won the Best Actress award at Outfest for her performance in Julie Johnson. In addition to her film recognition, Love has been nominated (with Hole) for multiple Grammy Awards for their third studio album, Celebrity Skin (1998).

Film

Golden Globe Awards
The Golden Globe Award is an accolade bestowed by the 93 members of the Hollywood Foreign Press Association (HFPA) recognizing excellence in film and television, both domestic and foreign.

MTV Movie Awards
The MTV Movie Awards is an annual award show presented by MTV to honor outstanding achievements in films. Founded in 1992, the winners of the awards are decided online by the audience.

Satellite Awards
The Satellite Awards are a set of annual awards given by the International Press Academy.

Critics associations

Music

Grammy Awards

MTV Video Music Awards

NME Awards

References 

Awards
Lists of awards received by American actor
Lists of awards received by American musician